Ken Mansfield (born 7 September 1958) is a former Australian rules footballer who played with Essendon in the Victorian Football League (VFL). He won Essendon's most improved player award in 1979. Mansfield later played for Woodville in the South Australian National Football League (SANFL) and Victorian Football Association (VFA) sides Sandringham and Coburg.

Notes

External links 		
		

Essendon Football Club past player profile	
		
		
		

Living people
1958 births
Australian rules footballers from Victoria (Australia)		
Essendon Football Club players
Woodville Football Club players
Sandringham Football Club players
Coburg Football Club players